John Mahon (born 26 November 1999) is an Irish professional footballer who plays as a defender for League of Ireland Premier Division club Sligo Rovers.

Club career

Sligo Rovers
Mahon began playing for his local club Sligo Rovers at underage under 17 level in 2015, where he played for 2 years before progressing to the under 19 side and then the first team in 2017. He made his first team debut on 17 April 2017 in a 1–0 win away to Finn Harps in a League of Ireland Cup tie at Finn Park. That proved to be his only appearance of the season despite being named as an unused substitute in 19 league games. His League of Ireland Premier Division debut came on 21 April 2018 in a 0–0 draw with St Patrick's Athletic at The Showgrounds. In June 2018 he earned a new two-and-a-half-year contract to keep him at the club until the end of the 2020 season. Mahon scored his first goal in senior football on 26 October 2018 in a 2–0 win over Shamrock Rovers in the final game of the season. He made a total of 29 appearances during his breakthrough season, scoring 1 goal. February 2019 saw reported interest in Mahon from Scottish Premiership arch rivals Celtic and Rangers. On 2 February 2020, Mahon suffered a broken tibia in a pre-season friendly against Athlone Town. The injury kept him out of action for almost the entirety of the season but he returned to the side in October 2020 and made 5 appearances in all competitions by the season's end. Upon returning from injury in October 2020, Mahon signed a new two-year-contract with the club. On 29 October 2021, Mahon scored his first goal in just over three years when he opened the scoring in a 2–0 win over Drogheda United. On 21 December 2021, he signed a contract with to keep him at the club until the end of 2023. Upon signing his new contract, Mahon stated that he had a desire to play abroad but for now his focus was on helping his club to win trophies. The following month however, the six figure release clause in his contract was met and he departed the club. He made 102 appearances in total for Sligo Rovers during his time at the club, scoring 2 goals.

St Johnstone
Mahon signed a two-and-a-half-year deal with Scottish Premiership side St Johnstone for an undisclosed fee on 23 January 2022.

He left St. Johnstone only a year into his contract, with the club and player mutually agreeing to terminate his contract.

Career statistics

References

1999 births
Living people
People from Sligo (town)
Association footballers from County Sligo
Republic of Ireland association footballers
Sligo Rovers F.C. players
St Johnstone F.C. players
League of Ireland players
Scottish Professional Football League players
Association football defenders
Republic of Ireland expatriate association footballers
Irish expatriate sportspeople in Scotland
Expatriate footballers in Scotland